Wishmaster: The Prophecy Fulfilled is a 2002 Canadian fantasy horror film directed by Chris Angel and starring Michael Trucco, Tara Spencer-Nairn, Jason Thompson, Victor Webster, Kimberly Huie, and John Novak. It is the fourth and final installment of the Wishmaster series.

Plot 
As in the previous films, an evil genie is released from his prison and must grant three wishes to the person who awakens him in order to release the race of Djinn from Hell and allow them to take over the Earth.

Painter Sam and his girlfriend Lisa have just moved in together, when he has a terrible accident that leaves him paraplegic when the bones in his lower legs are fractured. Due to his condition, Sam grows ever more distant from Lisa, ruminating on his and Lisa's inability to have sex, and believing that she is having an affair with their lawyer Steven.

Sensing Sam's growing distance from Lisa, Steven offers Lisa a jewel he found hidden away in an antique desk. The jewel, unknown to Steven, is the Djinn's cell. Lisa inadvertently awakens the Djinn, which secretly kills Steven and takes his form. The Djinn/Steven begins making advances on Lisa to trick her into making wishes.

She first wishes for the case on Sam's condition to be won. The Djinn calls the opposing attorney and forces him to torture himself until he signs a settlement for 10 million dollars. The Djinn next takes Lisa out to a restaurant called The Palace to celebrate the winning of the case, asking her what she wishes for the most. When she says she wishes Sam could walk again, the Djinn grants this wish, enabling Sam to walk, but not repairing the injuries that left him paralyzed. They next go to Steven's place where they share champagne. While getting more for them to drink, the Djinn hears Lisa wish she could love "Steven" for who he really is.

Aware that his true form will lose her forever, he is unable to grant the third wish right away. The Djinn spends much time trying to decipher human love in order to "make" Lisa truly love him, and in the process he develops feelings for her.

An angel attempts to kill Lisa to prevent the third wish from being granted to her, which would cause the release of all Djinn and an ensuing armageddon. However, Steven arrives and sends her away to safety. The angel and the Djinn fight, with the Djinn eventually winning the battle and killing the angel. Steven later arrives at Lisa's house and they have sex in the living room. Lisa realizes she has missed having sex but does not love Steven. Steven asks Lisa very emphatically if she "truly [loves him] for who [he is]" in an attempt to make her grant the third wish; however she is taken aback and somewhat repulsed by his pushiness.

The Djinn brethren make their presence known, forcing Lisa to flee. Using his magic to make the upstairs a looping maze, Steven brings Lisa back to the bedroom and reveals his true form to her, offering Lisa a choice: take his hand as the second in command when the Djinn race takes over the world, or to be cast down to another dimension of Hell.

Sam returns and tries to save the day with the angel's sword, but is stabbed by the Djinn. While the Djinn is still attempting to convince Lisa to take his hand, Sam signals Lisa to push the Djinn through the blade, which is sticking out of Sam. Lisa does so, and both the Djinn and Sam perish. Lisa makes it out of the house and looks back at it, remembering the happier times that she and Sam shared.

Cast 
 Tara Spencer-Nairn as Lisa Burnley
 Michael Trucco as Steven Verdel
 Jason Thompson as Sam 
 John Novak as The Dijnn
 Victor Webster as Hunter
 John Benjamin Martin as Douglas Hollister
 Kimberly Huie as Tracy
 Mariam Bernstein as Jennifer
 Mandy Hochbaum as Shopper
 Jennifer Pudavick as Waitress

Production 
The film was shot back to back with its predecessor Wishmaster 3: Beyond the Gates of Hell with only a weekend separating the two. Both films were shot in Winnipeg, Manitoba, Canada. In a scene where the Djinn shows Lisa an illusion of paradise, they are standing on a pond in Assiniboine Park, a notable locale for the city. The Assiniboine Park Pavilion can be seen just above the tree line in the background of the scene.

Reception
On Rotten Tomatoes the film has an approval rating of 20% based on reviews from 5 critics.

David Nusair of Reel Film Reviews gave it 2.5 out of 4 and wrote: "Wishmaster 4 easily redeems the series after the horrible second and third installments."

References

External links 
 

2002 fantasy films
2002 films
2002 horror films
Artisan Entertainment films
Direct-to-video horror films
Direct-to-video sequel films
English-language Canadian films
Genies in film
Canadian supernatural horror films
Films about wish fulfillment
Wishmaster films
2000s English-language films
2000s Canadian films